"Escúchame" is a song by Puerto Rican entertainer Carlos Ponce from his second studio album, Todo lo Que Soy (1999). The song was written and produced by Marco Flores. It was released as the album's lead single on August 16, 1999, by EMI Latin. A flamenco pop ballad, it features Ponce making a plea to a woman he loves. The song received positive reactions from music critics, who praised its melody and genre. Commercially, the song reached number one on the Billboard Hot Latin Songs and Latin Pop Airplay charts in the United States. The song's music video was filmed in Old San Juan in Puerto Rico and features the artist impressing a woman in a club. A Portuguese-language version of the song was released in Brazil, where it reached number one.

Background and composition
In 1998, Ponce released his self-titled debut album, which spawned two hit singles ("Rezo" and "Decir Adiós") and had sold over 450,000 copies worldwide. The record led to Ponce winning the Billboard Latin Music Award for Pop Album of the Year by a New Artist in 1999. On July 22, 1999, Ponce announced that he was releasing his second studio album, Todo lo Que Soy, which was released on September 21, 1999, and recorded at the Crescent Moon Studios in Miami, Florida. Ponce recruited several songwriters for the project such as Marco Flores, Tim Mitchell, and Roberto Blades. Flores penned two of the album's track including "Escúchame", which he also produced. A flamenco pop ballad, the singer is "pleading calls for love". The lyrics narrate the "plea of a lover to a beautiful woman". The track utilizes flamenco guitars and hand clapping.

Promotion and reception
"Escúchame" as released as the album's lead single on August 16, 1999. Ponce performed the song live at a free concert at the Coconut Grove in Miami, Florida, on September 28. He also sung the track live during a halftime show at the Miami Dolphins versus Philadelphia Eagles game on October 24, 1999. The music video for the song was filmed at Old San Juan in Puerto Rico and features the artist dancing in n club while being enamored by a woman. A Portuguese-language version of the song featuring Brazilian singer  was released exclusively to Brazil in 2000 and reached number one in the country, according to Crowley Broadcast Analysis. A music video for the Portuguese version was released in Brazil as well.

Billboard editor John Lannert regarded the track to be "flamenco-laced" and stated its "sonic vibe recalls the chugging grooves of Enrique Iglesias' 'Bailamos'". The Dallas Morning News Mario Tarradell found "Escúchame" to be "invigorating". Laura Emerick of the Chicago Sun-Times highlighted the song where Ponce "lets more of his personality shine through this time" on the disc.  The Houston Chronicle critic Joey Guerra felt that the song "should have no problem finding an audience" and complimented Ponce's vocals, as it works "nicely with the song's airy rhythms and hand claps." Commercially, the song topped the Billboard Hot Latin Songs and Latin Pop Airplay charts in the US, making it Ponce's third number one on both charts.

Formats and track listings

Promotional single 
 Escúchame3:14
 La Entrevista6:29

European single 
Escúchame3:14
Ameilia (club mix)3:41

Remixes 
 Escúchame (The Eurolatin Mix)3:16
 Escúchame (Mannos De Papa Mix)3:15
 Escúchame (Radio Dance Mix)3:07

Pablo Flores remix 
Escúchame (Pablo Flores Club Mix Radio Edit)4:47

Brazilian single 
 Original Version3:16
 Original Version (featuring )3:17
 Hitmakers Samba Mix (featuring )3:27
 Hitmakers Radio Edit3:45
 Hitmakers Extended Mix5:21
 Version Balada3:14

Charts

Weekly charts

Year-end charts

See also 
List of number-one Billboard Hot Latin Tracks of 1999
List of Billboard Latin Pop Airplay number ones of 1999

References

1999 singles
1999 songs
1990s ballads
Carlos Ponce songs
Latin ballads
Pop ballads
Spanish-language songs
Songs written by Marco Flores (songwriter)
EMI Latin singles